The Philippine expedition may refer to:

 Philippine expedition (Albatross), a scientific research expedition to the Philippines from 1907 to 1910.
 1st Separate Brigade (Philippine Expedition), an expeditionary brigade of the United States Army, organized during the Spanish–American War.
 Miguel López de Legazpi's 16th century travel to the Philippines to establish a permanent Spanish colony.